ICC World Cricket League Division Eight was the lowest division of the World Cricket League (WCL) system for its 2009–14 and 2012–18 cycles. Like all other divisions, WCL Division Eight was contested as a standalone tournament rather than as an actual league.

The inaugural Division Eight tournament was held in 2010, hosted and won by Kuwait. The 2012 tournament was hosted by Samoa and won by Vanuatu. The 2010 and 2012 were the only editions to be held before the WCL was downsized to five divisions, with both featuring eight teams who qualified via regional events. Vanuatu, Bhutan, and Suriname were the only teams to participate in both tournaments. Vanuatu is the only team to progress from Division Eight to Division Five.

Results

Performance by team
Legend
 – Champions
 – Runners-up
 – Third place
Q – Qualified
    — Hosts

 Note: the teams placing first and second at each tournament were promoted to Division Seven, while all other teams were relegated to regional qualifiers.

Player statistics

References

Division 8